Harold D. Hirsch (October 19, 1881 – September 25, 1939) was a student at the University of Georgia from 1898 to 1901 who also played football for his alma mater. After graduation from the University of Georgia, he studied law at Columbia University and later became general counsel for The Coca-Cola Company, serving in that capacity for more than thirty years.

Hirsch was the co-developer of the unique shape of the iconic Coca-Cola bottle and its logo in 1913 with Earl Dean. In 1932, a new building was funded and completed for the University of Georgia School of Law that was named "Harold Hirsch Hall" to honor Hirsch for his contributions to the University of Georgia School of Law.

References

External links
 Harold Hirsch profile
 History of Coca-Cola Bottles on sodamusuem.com
 All-time Football Lettermen at Georgia

1881 births
1939 deaths
Georgia Bulldogs football players
Georgia (U.S. state) lawyers
Jewish American sportspeople
Players of American football from Atlanta
University of Georgia alumni
20th-century American lawyers